Look After Your Daughters (German: Hütet eure Töchter) is a 1922 Austrian silent comedy film directed by Sidney M. Goldin and starring Franz Höbling, Anny Ondra and Carl Lamac.

Cast
 Franz Höbling   
 Carlo Rittermann  
 Karel Lamač    
 Anna Kallina   
 Molly Picon
 Sybill de Brée   
 Anny Ondra  
 Pauline Schweighofer

References

Bibliography
 Bock, Hans-Michael & Bergfelder, Tim. The Concise CineGraph. Encyclopedia of German Cinema. Berghahn Books, 2009.

External links 
 

1922 films
Austrian comedy films
Austrian silent feature films
1922 comedy films
Austrian black-and-white films
Silent comedy films
1920s German-language films